Bianca Rivera (born ) in San Juan, Puerto Rico is a Puerto Rican female volleyball player. She was part of the Puerto Rico women's national volleyball team. 

She participated in the 2013 FIVB Volleyball World Grand Prix.
On club level she played for Bayamon in 2013.

References

External links
 FIVB Profile

1987 births
Living people
Puerto Rican women's volleyball players
People from San Juan, Puerto Rico
Creighton Bluejays women's volleyball players